Anton Husgafvel (26 September 1900 – 17 June 1980) was a Finnish sprinter. He competed in the men's 100 metres and the 4x100 metres relay events at the 1924 Summer Olympics.

References

External links
 

1900 births
1980 deaths
Finnish male sprinters
Athletes (track and field) at the 1924 Summer Olympics
Olympic athletes of Finland
People from Pirkkala
Sportspeople from Pirkanmaa